East Shore Historic District, also known as Lake Maxinkuckee Historic District,
 is a national historic district located in Union Township, Marshall County, Indiana.  The district encompasses 114 contributing buildings, 3 contributing sites, and 1 contributing structure in a resort development along the shore of Lake Maxinkuckee.  It developed between about 1873 and 1945, and includes examples of Late Victorian, Colonial Revival, and Bungalow / American Craftsman style architecture.  The district includes Maxinkuckee Country Club. Notable buildings include the Norris Farmhouse (Maple Grove Hotel), Trone Cottage (c. 1920), Roach-Rockwood Cottage (c. 1923), Elliott Cottage (c. 1875), Gates-Holliday Cottage (1897), Marmon Cottage (c. 1880), and Norman Perry House.

It was listed in the National Register of Historic Places in 1998.

References

Historic districts on the National Register of Historic Places in Indiana
Colonial Revival architecture in Indiana
Victorian architecture in Indiana
Historic districts in Marshall County, Indiana
National Register of Historic Places in Marshall County, Indiana